The Vivero Letter (1998) is an adventure movie starring Robert Patrick, Fred Ward and Tom Poster. This movie is based on the 1968 novel The Vivero Letter by Desmond Bagley.

Plot
A man in Central America finds his brother's murdered body. It turns out that his brother has been murdered because he knows the whereabouts of a lost city in the jungle. The man teams up with a search expedition and goes off to hunt for these ancient ruins. Unfortunately, almost every member of the group has plans to double-cross the others. All is resolved in bloody fashion in the middle of the jungle wilderness.

Cast
Robert Patrick - James Wheeler
Fred Ward - Andrew Fallon
Chiara Caselli - Caterina Carrara
John Lewis
John Verea - Raoul Gato
Tom Poster - Ray Wheeler
Juan Patricio Arenas - Salinas
Daniela Alviani - Milena Brava
Walter Castro - Thug #1

External links

1998 films
1990s adventure films